The 2014–15 season of the División de Honor de Waterpolo is the 92nd season of top-tier water polo in Spain since its inception in 1925.

The season comprises regular season and championship playoff. The regular season started in October 2014 and finished on April 25, 2015. The top eight teams at standing played in the championship playoff.

The championship playoff began with the quarter finals series on 5 May.

Atlètic-Barceloneta won its tenth consecutive title after defeating CE Mediterrani in the Championship Final series 2–0.

Competition

Format
The División de Honor season took place between October and May, with every team playing each other at home and away for a total of 22 matches. Points were awarded according to the following:
3 points for a win
1 point for a draw

The team with the highest number of points at the end of the 22 matches became the champion.

Promotion and relegation
The bottom team in the standings at the end of the season was relegated to Primera División, while the top team from Primera División was promoted.

Team information

The following 12 clubs compete in the División de Honor during the 2014–15 season:

Regular season standings

Schedule and results

Championship playoffs

Quarter-finals

1st match

2nd match

 Atlètic-Barceloneta wins series 2–0.

3rd match

 Mataró Quadis wins series 2–1. 

 Mediterrani wins series 2–1. 

 Sabadell wins series 2–1.

Semifinals

1st match

2nd match

 Mediterrani wins series 2–0. 

 Atlètic-Barceloneta wins series 2–0.

Final

1st match

2nd match

 Atlètic-Barceloneta wins championship Final series 2–0.

Individual awards
 Championship MVP:  Sergi Mora, CN Terrassa
 Best Goalkeeper:  Michał Diakonów, CN Mataró Quadis
 Top goalscorer:  Sergi Mora, CN Terrassa

Relegation playoff
Playoff to be played in two legs. 1st leg to be played on 9 May and 2nd leg on 16 May. The overall winner will play in División de Honor 2015–16 and the loser will play in Primera Nacional.

|}

1st leg

2nd leg

 19–19 on aggregate. Waterpolo Navarra won the penalty shoot-out 3–0 and remained in División de Honor.

Season statistics

Top goalscorers

Number of teams by autonomous communities

References

See also
 2014–15 División de Honor Femenina de Waterpolo

External links
 Real Federación Española de Natación 

División de Honor de Waterpolo
Seasons in Spanish water polo competitions
Spain
2014 in Spanish sport
2015 in Spanish sport
2014 in water polo
2015 in water polo